Alsėdžiai eldership (Alsėdžių seniūnija) is an eldership in Plungė District Municipality to the northeast of Plungė. The administrative center is Alsėdžiai.

Largest towns and villages 
Alsėdžiai
Žvirblaičiai
Yliai

Other villages

References 

Elderships in Plungė District Municipality